A special election was held in  on August 1, 1825, to fill a vacancy caused by the resignation of Henry Clay (A) on March 6, 1825 upon being named Secretary of State by President John Quincy Adams.

Election results

Clark took his seat December 5, 1825

See also
List of special elections to the United States House of Representatives

References

Kentucky 1825 03
Kentucky 1825 03
1825 03
Kentucky 03
United States House of Representatives 03
United States House of Representatives 1825 03